The Men's elimination race was held on 20 October 2016.

Results

References

Men's elimination race
European Track Championships – Men's elimination race